Bright Gyamfi (born 20 January 1996) is a Ghanaian footballer who plays as a defender who plays for Italian  club Potenza.

Club career
On 19 January 2022, he returned to Benevento.

References

1996 births
Footballers from Accra
Living people
Ghanaian footballers
Association football defenders
Benevento Calcio players
A.C. Reggiana 1919 players
Potenza Calcio players
Serie A players
Serie B players
Serie C players
Ghanaian expatriate footballers
Expatriate footballers in Italy
Ghanaian expatriate sportspeople in Italy